Moza Samunder is a village about 6.5 km far from lari adda Bhowana, Pakistan. The Hanjra family is the only landholding family and own large swath of land in the village, and are generally considered to be one of the most richest, educated and talented tribe in the area. Hanjra family in Samunder is descent of a Sufi Islamic Scholar Hafiz Mian Barkhurdar. This family is very well known for their intelligence, and name Samunder was given to this village because of high level of education and wisdom. They served the community with their education and moral values, and are known for their hospitality. The Hanjra family is also known for its religious teaching, belief, and practicing Islam.

The majority of the people engaged in agriculture, although having higher education, but now the situation is different and the next generation is doing government and private sectors job and their own businesses.

Residents

 Mian Sultan Ahmad Hanjra (late) landlord, Renowned Hakeem, religious minded and well known local politician.  He graduated from Islamia College Lahore in early 1940s. He joined  government job but very soon he resigned and preferred to serve native people. He was elected Chairman Union Council in late 1970s. He was very active social worker. He was famous for his  wisdom, honesty, charity and simplicity.
 Mian Hassam-ud-Din Hunjra  (late) landlord. He was very active member of Jamaat-i-Islami. He was very impressed by Molana Modudi and followed his school of thoughts.  He was elder brother of Mian Sultan Ahmad Hunjra. Both Brothers were famous for the affection, they have for each other. He was against the feudalism. The then Member of the National Assembly of Pakistan Molana Muhammad Zakir used to consult him on political matters.  He guided/strongly supported Molana Muhammad Zakir, who was contesting National Assembly seat against a local Feudal Lord. Both the times Molana won the National Assembly seat. 
Mian Muhammad Amien Hanjra (late) landlord, (Persian/Urdu & Punjabi poet) cousin of Mian sultan Ahmad. His book on Persian poetry was published in early 1990s (Huzniat-i-Hazeen). His Urdu and Punjabi poetry is  also available in unpublished form.
 Mian Muhammad Yar Hunjra (late) landlord. Cousin of Mian Muhamad Amien. He did his Master of Philosophy in early 1940s. After completion of education he focused on agriculture.
 Mian Ghulam Muhammad Rangeen Hanjra (late) Urdu poet & editor/founder of Arooj Akhbar, which was locally published from Jhang City. His Urdu poetry (Ghuncha-i-Rngeen) published in his lifetime.
 Mian Abdul Razzaq Hanjra landlord & politician (nephew of Mian Sultan Ahmad). He was elected  Nazim, Union Council twice consecutively. His younger brother, Mian Abdul Qayyum, is Ameer,  Jamaat-i-Islami (District Chiniot) and very active in local politics. 
 Mian Rafique Ahmed Hanjra Headman (Numberdar)
 Mian Allah Yar Hanjra (late) landlord and scholar. He was very famous for charity.     
 Mian Inayat Hussain Hanjra (late) landlord (son of Mian Allah Yar)
 Mian Sheikh Ahmed Hanjra (late) landlord & Sufi.  (Cousin of Mian Inayat Hussain)
 Mian Noor Hassan (late) teacher
 Mian Muhammad Bakhash Hanjra (Late) Advocate
 Mian Ahmed Bakhash Hanjra (Late) Former Headman (Numberdar)
 Mian Aslam Hanjra (late) teacher
 Mian Muhammad Afzal Hanjra (Late) Adovacte
 Mian Akhter Ahmed Hanjra (civil engineer) (late)
 Dr Mian Muhammad Ajmal Hanjra Surgeon (FRCS)

Villages in Chiniot District
Chiniot District